The following lists events that happened during 1994 in Laos.

Incumbents
President: Nouhak Phoumsavanh 
Prime Minister: Khamtai Siphandon

Events

Births
2 February - Phoutdavy Phommasane, footballer
3 June - Sengdao Inthilath, footballer
2 September - Sitthideth Khanthavong, footballer
10 October - Khonesavanh Sihavong, footballer

References

 
Years of the 20th century in Laos
Laos
1990s in Laos
Laos